Events from the year 1975 in Taiwan, Republic of China. This year is numbered Minguo 64 according to the official Republic of China calendar.

Incumbents 
 President – Chiang Kai-shek, Yen Chia-kan
 Vice President – Yen Chia-kan, Chiang Ching-kuo
 Premier – Chiang Ching-kuo
 Vice Premier – Hsu Ching-chung

Events

February
 10 February – The opening of Chinese Culture and Movie Center in Taipei.

April
 5 April – President Chiang Kai-shek died in age 88, Yen Chia-kan became the President of the Republic of China.

July
 8 July – The establishment of diplomatic relations with Paraguay.
 26 July – The opening of Beipu Station of Taiwan Railways Administration in Xincheng Township, Hualien County.

December
 20 December – 1975 Republic of China legislative election.

Births
 28 February – A-Sun, singer and songwriter
 19 March – Vivian Hsu, singer, actress and model
 9 May – Weng Li-you, pop singer
 27 May – Lin Chih-chien, Mayor of Hsinchu City
 6 June – Cheer Chen, singer and songwriter
 9 June – Serina Liu, actress (d. 2020)
 1 July – Kung Tsui-chang, Duke Yansheng
 5 October – Hsieh Kuo-liang, member of 6th, 7th and 8th Legislative Yuan
 15 October – Hsu Shu-hua, member of Legislative Yuan
 5 December – Laha Mebow, writer, producer and director
 10 December – Hsing Hui, actress

Deaths
 26 February – Li Hsi-mou, 79, former President of Taiwan Provincial Museum
 5 April – Chiang Kai-shek, 87, President
 23 December – Chen Pao-pei, table tennis player

References

 
Years of the 20th century in Taiwan